Heliocheilus julia is a North American moth in the family Noctuidae.  Heliocheilus julia is attracted to lights.  Its life history and host plants are unknown.

Distribution
Heliocheilus julia ranges from central New Mexico west to eastern Arizona and south to Jalisco, Mexico.

Flight
This moth has one flight from late July to September.

References

Moths of North America
Heliocheilus

Taxa named by Augustus Radcliffe Grote
Moths described in 1883